Gromshin is a village in Boychinovtsi Municipality, Montana Province, Bulgaria.

References

Villages in Montana Province